Ask Beccles is a 1933 British comedy crime film directed by Redd Davis and starring Garry Marsh, Lilian Oldland, Abraham Sofaer and John Turnbull. The film was based on a play by Cyril Campion. It was made at British and Dominions Elstree Studios as a quota quickie for release by Paramount Pictures.

Premise
A man steals a priceless diamond, but returns it when an innocent man is arrested for the theft.

Cast
 Garry Marsh as Eustace Beccles
 Lilian Oldland as Marion Holforth
 Abraham Sofaer as Baki
 Allan Jeayes as Matthew Blaise
 John Turnbull as Inspector Daniels
 Evan Thomas as Sir Frederick Boyne
 Eileen Munro as Mrs. Rivers
 Fewlass Llewellyn as Sir James Holforth

References

Bibliography
 Low, Rachael. Filmmaking in 1930s Britain. George Allen & Unwin, 1985.
 Wood, Linda. British Films, 1927-1939. British Film Institute, 1986.

External links

1933 films
Films directed by Redd Davis
British black-and-white films
British and Dominions Studios films
Films shot at Imperial Studios, Elstree
British films based on plays
Quota quickies
British crime comedy films
1930s crime comedy films
1933 comedy films
1930s English-language films
1930s British films